Indican is a colourless organic compound, soluble in water, naturally occurring in Indigofera plants. It is a precursor of indigo dye.

Chemical reactions
Common and significant reactions involving indican are as follows:
Indican is a glycoside. Its hydrolysis yields β-D-glucose and indoxyl.
Reaction of indoxyl (indican) by a mild oxidizing agent, e.g. atmospheric oxygen, yields indigo dye which is blue in colour.

Medical significance

Biosynthesis
A reaction, similar to the above-mentioned is seen in the normal population, who excrete small amounts of the chemical in their urine. Normal urine reacting to hydrogen peroxide does at times produce a bluish tinge.
Tryptophan is first converted to indole (excreted in faeces), then to indican by bacteria in the gut. Indican, being water-soluble, is then excreted through the urine. Following absorption from the gut, indole is converted to 3-hydroxy indole (indoxyl or indican) in the liver, where it is again then conjugated with sulfuric acid or glucuronic acid through normal xenobiotic metabolism pathways. It is then transported to the kidneys for excretion.

The enzyme "indoxyl esterase" has been found in humans and is involved in another pathway of chemical reactions involving indoxyl.

Pathology
In individuals affected by the blue diaper syndrome, the patients exhibit a defect in tryptophan metabolism. Tryptophan is first converted to indole, then to indican by bacteria in the gut. Indican is then excreted into the urine and from there into the diaper where, upon exposure to air, it is converted to indigo blue dye due to oxidation by atmospheric oxygen.

Indican interferes with many commercial procedures for measuring total bilirubin which can be a problem for renal failure patients where blood indican levels are raised. It can cause gastrointestinal symptoms in patients where protein absorption is reduced - like Hartnup's disease, allowing for greater bacterial decomposition of the tryptophan to indole and its conversion to indican.

References

Indoles
Glucosides